Skilton Ledge is a relatively flat rectangular rock platform at the southeast margin of Midnight Plateau, Darwin Mountains. The upper surface (2070 m) is ice covered but a rock cliff forms the south end. Named after Larry Skilton, Connecticut ham radio operator who made phone patches in the United States to complete radio communications from United States Antarctic Program (USAP) science stations including Palmer, McMurdo, Byrd surface station, and particularly South Pole. He worked a regular nightly schedule for 11 years (1990–2001) and arranged the completion of several thousand calls.

Ridges of Oates Land